Munianwala railway station is located in Pakistan.

Situated near Chiniot district and 13 km from Chiniot, this railway station connects Chiniot with Jhumrah.

See also
 List of railway stations in Pakistan
 Pakistan Railways

References

External links

Railway stations in Bahawalnagar District